Delaware is the ninth-richest state in the United States of America, with a per capita income of $23,305 (2000) and a personal per capita income of $32,810 (2003). The per capita income in 2010 was $29,007.

Delaware counties ranked by per capita income

Note: Data is from the 2010 United States Census Data and the 2006-2010 American Community Survey 5-Year Estimates.

Delaware places ranked by per capita income

References

Economy of Delaware
Delaware
Income